The United Kingdom Census 1981 was a census of the United Kingdom of Great Britain and Northern Ireland carried out on 5 April 1981. The census will be released in 2081 or 2082 after 100 years.

See also
Census in the United Kingdom
List of United Kingdom censuses

References

1981
Census
April 1981 events in the United Kingdom
United Kingdom